Abraham Danielsz. Hondius (about 1631 – 17 September 1691) was a Dutch Golden Age painter known for his depictions of animals. He was the son of a city stonemason, Daniel Abramsz de Hondt.

Hondius was born in Rotterdam and trained under Pieter de Bloot (1601–1658) and Cornelis Saftleven. He lived in Rotterdam until 1659 and moved then to Amsterdam. He moved to London in 1666, where he spent the rest of his life. Hondius combined throughout his career several stylistic influences and struggled to develop a style of his own. He however specialised somehow in animal pieces: more than two-thirds of his paintings, etchings and drawings are hunting scenes, animals fighting and animal studies. He also executed landscapes, genre and religious scenes.

Hondius most likely moved to London in 1666 where he spent the rest of his life and died.  He painted views of London such as The Frozen Thames and London Bridge.  His last known work is Ape and Cat Fighting over Dead Poultry, dated 1690.

References

1625 births
1691 deaths
Dutch Golden Age painters
Dutch male painters
Painters from Rotterdam
Dutch emigrants to the Kingdom of England